Lomatium geyeri, or Geyer's biscuitroot,  is a perennial herb in the family Apiaceae found in the Northwestern United States and British Columbia.

References

External links
USDA Plants Profile for Lomatium geyeri

geyeri
Flora of the Northwestern United States
Flora of British Columbia
Taxa named by John Merle Coulter
Taxa named by Sereno Watson
Flora without expected TNC conservation status